Eminönü, historically known as Pérama, is a predominantly commercial waterfront area of Istanbul within the Fatih district near the confluence of the Golden Horn with the southern entrance of the Bosphorus strait and the Sea of Marmara. It is connected to Karaköy (historic Galata) via the Galata Bridge across the Golden Horn. It was administered as part of the Sultanahmet district from 1928 to 2009 when Sultanahmet was absorbed into Fatih.

Eminönü's busy main square is overlooked by the New Mosque (Yeni Cami in Turkish) and the Spice Bazaar (Mısır Çarşısı in Turkish).

Eminönü is an important transport hub. Several ferries have terminals along the Eminönü waterfront and the T1 tram has a stop here. 

To the southeast Eminönü runs into Sirkeci, while to the northwest it merges with the shopping areas of Tahtakale and Küçükpazar. Inland from Eminönü is another shopping district, Mahmutpaşa.

In Turkish, Eminönü means 'in front of justice' ('emin' meaning 'justice' and 'önü' meaning 'in front of'). The name probably came from the Ottoman courts and customs houses on the docks; "Emin" was the title of an Ottoman customs official.

History

Eminönü's position on the Golden Horn made it a natural port, with the peninsula above it being eminently defensible. It was this location that led to the foundation of Byzantium, and from here that the city grew, with the oldest neighbourhoods being the port districts along the Golden Horn. By the 12th century, merchants from Venice, Amalfi, Genoa and Pisa had also settled in the area, acquiring their own wharfs and waterfront districts.

In the Byzantine period, the modern area of Eminönü included the districts of Neórion (after the harbor located there), Akrópolis, Kynégion, Arcadianae/Arkadianaí, ta Hormísdou, Amantíou, Caenopolis/Kainópolis ("New City"), ta Kanikleíou, ta Narsoú, ta Kaisaríou, Artopoleía (the "bakeries"), Argyroprateía (the "silver vendors"), Chalkoprateía (the "bronze vendors"), ta Olybríou, Constantinianae/Konstantinianaí, ta Amastrianón, Eugeníou, Pérama ("Crossing", the place where the ferry to Galata sailed), Zeúgma, Stauríon, Vlánga, Heptáskalon.

Eminönü's appearance changed significantly in the 16th and 17th centuries with the creation of the New Mosque (completed in 1591) and the Spice Bazaar which was built in 1660 as a sale outlet for goods imported overland from Egypt. Nearby in Tahtakale, the Rüstem Paşa Mosque was designed for a grand vizier in the middle of the 16th century. To make space for the New Mosque a community of Jews was moved out of Eminönu and relocated in Hasköy on the other side of the Golden Horn. 

Eminönü was still a thriving port area in Ottoman times, occupied by importers, warehousemen, sailors and traders of every description, with a labyrinth of narrow streets, workshops and markets leading uphill to Topkapı Palace, the Ottoman administrative centre. Many early stone hans (caravanserais) still survive in Tahtakale.

Improved  transport connections greatly altered Eminönü in the 19th century.  In 1841 the first permanent Galata Bridge across the Golden Horn linked Eminönü more closely to Karaköy where steamships docked, while the Orient Express train service from Europe terminated at nearby Sirkeci Station from 1888. 

Towards the end of the Ottoman era many grand stone buildings were built in the area between Eminönü and Sirkeci. Among them were the Main Post Office and some commercial buildings like the Istanbul 4th Vakıf Han.

In the early days of the Republic of Turkey, Eminönü was extensively reconfigured. The tollbooths at the end of the Galata Bridge were cleared away to create a large square in front of the Yeni Mosque and a road was built to link the waterfront with the new Atatürk Bridge at Unkapanı. The coast road was later extended on reclaimed land to run around Sarayburnu and out to Atatürk Airport.

Eminönü today

Eminönü is home to the busiest ferry crossings for the Bosphorus and the Marmara Sea as well as to the car ferry across the Bosphorus to Harem. The Sirkeci Railway Station (where trains can be caught to Bucharest) is nearby. The T1 tram from Kabataş to Bağcılar also passes through Eminönü.

There is some housing in Eminönü but most of the buildings are offices, shops and workshops. At night it is a quiet place. Every day roughly two million people work in or pass through Eminönü, but the district has only 30,000 residents. The people that do live in Eminönü are mainly working class and conservative.

In the late 2010s, work began on restoring the Yeni Mosque and the Spice Bazaar. Work was still continuing on the Yeni Mosque in 2022.

Landmarks

Eminönü has several historical mosques and buildings,

 New Mosque (Yeni Cami) - the mosque that dominates the waterfront by the Galata Bridge; there is an open space in front where people feed the pigeons.
 The Spice Bazaar - beside the Yeni Mosque and facing the water, the Spice Bazaar increasingly sells a range of tourist merchandise as well as the traditional spices.
 Istanbul 4th Vakıf Han, a former office building redeveloped to the five-star Legacy Ottoman Hotel
 Tomb of Sultan Abdülhamid I
 Türkiye İş Bankası Museum
 Tomb of Hatice Turhan Sultan
 Rüstem Paşa Mosque

Shopping in Eminönü

The enclosed Spice Bazaar is the most prominent place to shop, with stalls selling tourist merchandise increasingly squeezing out the traditional spice booths. On one side outdoor stalls sell pets and garden items, on the other they sell cheese, sweets, and fruit and vegetables.

The hill running up to Mahmutpaşa is lined with shops selling household goods, clothes and circumcision outfits for young boys.

The hans of Tahtakale sell everything from household goods and delicatessen items to freshly ground coffee and packaging.

Heading inland towards Sirkeci there are many shops selling photographic equipment, bicycles, and stationery.

Eating in Eminönü

Eminönü used to be well known for the grilled mackerel sandwiches sold from boats moored by the Galata Bridge. The authorities have tried to close them down although in 2022 three were still hanging on.

On the road running inland to Sirkeci the Ali Muhiddin Hacı Beki r confectionery shop has been in business since 1777. It is famous for its Turkish Delight and other traditional Ottoman sweets.

In popular culture
The following movies have scenes taking place in Eminönü:
 Skyfall (2012)
 Taken 2 (2012)
 Argo (2012)

Notable people
 

Onur Aydın (born 1988), footballer

References

External links

 Eminönü photographs with explanations 
 Eminönü Photographs
 Restaurants In Sirkeci

Quarters of Fatih
Golden Horn
Transit centers in Istanbul
Shopping districts and streets in Turkey